Paul Annacone (born March 20, 1963) is an American former touring professional tennis player and current tennis coach. He is the former coach of 20-time Grand Slam winner Roger Federer, 14-time Grand Slam winner Pete Sampras, and 2017 US Open champion Sloane Stephens. Annacone is currently a coach at ProTennisCoach.com, a commentator at Tennis Channel, and works with Taylor Fritz.

Career

Player

High school
As an eighth grader, Paul played first singles for Shoreham-Wading River High School and was undefeated in league play. Annacone graduated from East Hampton High School in 1981.

College
After graduating from East Hampton, the 6'1, 175 lbs. Annacone played three years of college tennis for the University of Tennessee in the Southeastern Conference over 1982–84.  He was named the Intercollegiate Tennis Association Player of the Year in 1984. Annacone played 51–3 in singles while winning the ITA Indoor Singles Championship that year. He was named all-SEC and all-American all three years of his college career with the Volunteers, amassing a 115–22 career singles record.

Professional
The right-handed Annacone achieved his career best singles ranking in 1985 of world No. 12 and US No. 6. A serve-and-volleyer who would often chip and charge when returning serve, Annacone played on the ATP tour until 1992, amassing a career singles win-lose record of 157–131 in Grand Slam, Grand Prix, and ATP Tour events. He won three singles titles during his career and was a Wimbledon quarter-finalist in 1984. 

Annacone won more as a pro playing doubles, capturing 14 tournaments and achieving a high ranking in 1987 of world No. 3. With long-time partner Christo van Rensburg, Annacone won the 1985 Australian Open doubles title. Teamed with David Wheaton, Annacone was a 1990 US Open finalist, as well.

Coaching

Annacone achieved even greater success as Pete Sampras's long-time coach. The two worked together from January 1995 until December 2001, and again from July 2002 until Sampras' retirement. From December 2001 to January 2003 Annacone was Managing Director of the United States Tennis Association High Performance Program. He coached Tim Henman, beginning at the Paris Masters in 2003 (which Henman won) until the end of Henman's career in September 2007.

Annacone became the Lawn Tennis Association's Head Coach in November 2006. He also became Great Britain Davis Cup team coach in April 2008, following the resignation of Peter Lundgren, while staying on with the LTA. Under his control the team lost in the 2008 Davis Cup World Group Play-offs against Austria. The following year they got relegated to Group II. In May 2010, Annacone announced his official departure from November 2010 onwards from the LTA and the British Davis Cup team after losing to Lithuania in Group II first round.

Paul Annacone was hired by Roger Federer to be his full-time coach on August 28, 2010 after a successful one-month trial period. Annacone led Federer to two straight year-end championship in 2010 and 2011, a return to the world No. 1 ranking, and his seventh Wimbledon Championships.

In 2006 Annacone released the Paul Annacone Tactical Tennis DVD Series; a 4-DVD collection that demonstrates the strategies used by the pros in actual match situations. Attack the All-Court Player, Beat the Baseliner, Know Your Own Game, and Neutralize the Net-Rusher present numerous scenarios along with drills and practice games for improving match-specific strategy on both sides of the net.

In 2013, Annacone became a resident coach at ProTennisCoach.com – an online professional coaching site.

In November 2013, it was announced that Annacone had begun working with American rising star Sloane Stephens on a trial basis. She was ranked the world's number-12-player at the time. However, the two ended the relationship in July 2014.

Annacone is also involved with PlaySight Interactive, a sports technology company, where he works together with Darren Cahill on the Coaching and Player Development team.

In 2017, Annacone joined Stan Wawrinka's team for the grass court swing. For the 2018 season Annacone coached Taylor Fritz.

Career finals

Singles: 6 (3–3)

Doubles: 30 (14–16)

Doubles performance timeline

Personal life

Paul's son Nicholas attended his father's alma mater. His daughter, Olivia, attended the University of California, Los Angeles.

Annacone resides in Woodland Hills, California with his wife, Elisabeth Annacone, and son Emmett. He was inducted into the Suffolk Sports Hall of Fame on Long Island in the Tennis Category with the Class of 1996.

References

External links
 
 
 
 CNNSI.com interview

1963 births
Living people
American people of Italian descent
American expatriate sportspeople in England
American expatriates in England
American male tennis players
American tennis coaches
Australian Open (tennis) champions
Grand Slam (tennis) champions in men's doubles
People from Woodland Hills, Los Angeles
People from Southampton (town), New York
Tennessee Volunteers men's tennis players
Tennis commentators
Tennis people from California
Tennis people from New York (state)
People from East Hampton (town), New York
East Hampton High School alumni